William ("Bill") Hunt (23 February 1898 – 27 August 1977) was an Australian sprinter. He competed in the men's 100 metres and the men's 200 metres at the 1920 Summer Olympics. In both events Hunt qualified for the Quarter Finals and ran fourth. Hunt lived in Sydney's southern suburb of Redfern where he ran with the Redfern Harriers. Later Hunt devoted much of his post competition career to Track and Field Athletics being a starter for the Track and Field events at the Melbourne Summer Olympics of 1956 and then later being one of the founders of Little Athletics in New South Wales.

References

1898 births
1977 deaths
Athletes (track and field) at the 1920 Summer Olympics
Australian male sprinters
Olympic athletes of Australia
Place of birth missing